Samuel W. Gumpertz (1868 – June 22, 1952) was an American showman who played a part in the building of Coney Island's Dreamland. Gumpertz traveled the world in search of indigenous people to perform in the popular ethnographic sideshows of the day, including Filipinos who were exhibited in an "Igorot Village", long-necked women from Burma and people from Borneo who performed as "wild men of Borneo," who Gumpertz reportedly 'acquired' by paying two hundred bags of salt to tribal leaders.

References

1868 births
1952 deaths
American entertainment industry businesspeople